The Daughter of the Regiment is a 1953 musical comedy film directed by Géza von Bolváry and Goffredo Alessandrini and starring Antonella Lualdi, Hannelore Schroth, and Isa Barzizza. Based on the opera The Daughter of the Regiment by Gaetano Donizetti, it was made as a co-production between Italy and West Germany with separate versions released in the two languages.

The film' sets were designed by the art director Piero Filippone. It was shot at the Palatino Studios in Rome.

Cast

References

External links

West German films
1953 musical comedy films
German musical comedy films
Italian musical comedy films
1950s multilingual films
German multilingual films
Italian multilingual films
Films directed by Géza von Bolváry
Films directed by Goffredo Alessandrini
Films based on operas
Constantin Film films
Gaetano Donizetti
German black-and-white films
Films shot at Palatino Studios
1950s German films
1950s Italian films
1950s German-language films